The Red Terror is a 1942 Nazi propaganda film directed by Karl Ritter.

Released after the breakdown of the Molotov–Ribbentrop Pact, it is noteworthy for its depiction of Communists.

Plot
Olga Feodorovna, a Baltic German, saw her family massacred by the GPU. She joins it in order to track down the murderers. After avenging the deaths, she commits suicide.

Cast 
Laura Solari as Olga Feodorowna
Will Quadflieg as Peter Aßmuss
Marina von Ditmar as Irina
Andrews Engelmann as Nikolai Bokscha
Karl Haubenreißer as Jakob Frunse
Hans Stiebner as inquiry judge
Maria Bard as head of women's league
Helene von Schmithberg as Tante (Aunt) Ljuba
Albert Lippert as hotel director in Kovno (Kaunas)
Lale Andersen as singer in bar in Göteborg
Wladimir Majer as GPU chief
Nico Turoff as Frunse's assistant
Theo Shall as saboteur with Bokscha
Horst Winter as singer: 1st variation on "Limehouse Blues"
Ivo Veit as Soviet diplomat in Helsinki
Freddie Brocksieper with his jazz combo
Gösta Richter

References

External links 

1942 films
1940s spy drama films
German spy drama films
Films of Nazi Germany
1940s German-language films
German black-and-white films
Nazi propaganda films
Films set in the 1930s
Films set in 1940
Films set in Helsinki
Films set in the Netherlands
Films set in Sweden
Films about the Soviet Union in the Stalin era
Films directed by Karl Ritter
UFA GmbH films
1942 drama films
Anti-communism in Germany
1940s German films